Baumstam is a psychedelic rock band from Witten. The Rockband was organized in 1972 by Gerd Stracke, Ulrich Klawitter, Michael Lobbe und Michael Willecke. From 1974 the Dortmunder Volker Wobbe alternated with the Bassist Michael Willecke. In 1977 the band dissolved, reuniting in 2004.

Band history

Foundation and the first band years
Baumstam was founded by Gerd Stracke, Ulrich Klawitter, Michael Lobbe and Michael Willecke in 1972. In the first year, the band toured Germany, playing at both indoor and outdoor venues.  Their heavy fuzz guitar reflected the krautrock trend of the 1960s. In 1975, the LP On Tour was produced, decades later to attain a cult status among the collectors, commanding prices up to 400 Euro. In 1977, the band broke up over disagreements about their contract with Deutschen Grammophon.

Reincarnation
At the beginning of 2004, the Baumstam reunited with a reissue of On Tour.  Young guitarist and keyboarder Adrian Klawitter took the place of Michael Lobbe.  In January 2005, the LP/CD Dreams of Yesterday was released with new songs in the typical Baumstam style. Anna Weigand (vocals, flute, percussion) sang with the band from 2004 till August 2006.

Discography 
Studio albums

External links 
 Official website

Musical groups established in 1972
German psychedelic rock music groups
Krautrock musical groups